Eutogeneius fuscus is a species of beetles in the family Carabidae, the only species in the genus Eutogeneius.

References

Licininae
Monotypic Carabidae genera